The Sơn Tây prison camp was a POW camp operated by North Vietnam near Sơn Tây and approximately  west of Hanoi in the late 1960s through late 1970 and again in 1975. About 65 US prisoners of war were held there during the middle of the Vietnam War. It was later used to house foreigners captured in South Vietnam during the 1975 Spring Offensive.

Operation Ivory Coast 

On 21 November 1970, a US military force raided the camp in an attempt to rescue US POWs, however, the camp was found to have no POWs, as they had been secretly moved several months previously.

1975
In April/May 1975, the camp was returned to use when CIA agent James Lewis was taken there after being captured at Phan Rang Air Base on 16 April 1975 during the People's Army of Vietnam Spring Offensive. Lewis was joined several months later by 13 others including Paul Struharik, an AID official captured at Ban Me Thuot, Australian journalist Peter Whitlock, graduate student Jay Scarborough and missionaries John & Carolyn Miller and their family. On 30 October 1975 the prisoners were transported by a UN-chartered C-47 to Vientiane, Laos and then on to Bangkok, Thailand.

References

Vietnam War prisoner of war camps
Vietnam War sites
Defunct prisons in Vietnam
History of Hanoi
Historical sites in Hanoi
Buildings and structures in Hanoi